Graham Hicks (born 15 November 1985 in Morecambe, Lancashire) is an English strongman and powerlifter. He won the 2019 Britain's Strongest Man competition and placed second in 2014 and 2018. He is also a two time Europe's Strongest Man bronze medalist.

Personal life
Graham Hicks was born in 1985 in Morecambe, Lancashire. He was a keen sportsman in his childhood and teens although his main interest was football. He started training in the gym as a bodybuilder and at the age of 25, a friend asked him to try strongman training with him. He caught the strength bug, altered his training to accommodate this, and has since been exceedingly successful. 

He has a full-time job working as a design support engineer for BAE Systems, starting as an apprentice.

Strongman career
Hicks' career as a strongman began in 2010 as an under 105 kg competitor. He came 7th at the 2010 Northern England u105kg Qualifier and third at the 2010 England's Strongest Man u105 contests. 

In 2011, he dominated the u105kg scene and made his first foray into the Open weight scene beating people over 20 kg heavier than himself. 

In 2012, he committed himself to the Open weight category and made an impressive start to his open career, coming in 4th at the qualifier for Europe's Strongest Man. Whilst this didn't earn him a spot at Europe's, he did get an invitation to Britain's Strongest Man where he made an astonishing impact and gained 4th place. This placing gave him an invitation to the ultimate strength competition, World's Strongest Man, held in LA. He managed a very respectable 4th place in his group and even won his first event (loading race), his lack of top level experience being his major downfall.

His key strength has been his pressing power. He was the first person in the UK to lift a 200 kg log and has since gone on to press a 211 kg log in World Log Lifting Championships in 2015 along with Eddie Hall. Hicks and Hall both held the British Log Lift record at 211 kg. Hicks also attempted 220 kg but failed.

In September 2020, Hicks competed at the 2020 Europe's Strongest Man competition and achieved a new British record in the Log Lift, lifting . He placed 4th in the overall competition. In November 2020, Hicks competed at the 2020 World's Strongest Man competition and qualified for his first final. However, he had to withdraw from the competition due to a bicep tear.

Personal Records
Either done in official competition or in the gym
 Deadlift (Equipped & with figure 8 straps) – 453.5 kg (1,000 lb) - 2022 World Deadlift Championships
 Deadlift (Raw) – 405 kg (893 lb) - 2018 Andy Bolton Deadlift Challenge
 Squat (Raw with Wraps) – 440 kg (970 lb) - 2019 Big Dogs 4
 Bench Press (Raw) – 270 kg (595 lb) - 2019 Big Dogs 4
 Log Lift – 220 kg (485 lb) - 2020 Europe's Strongest Man

References

External links
Interview on British Strongman website
Official website

1985 births
Living people
English strength athletes
British strength athletes
English sportsmen
Sportspeople from Morecambe